This is a list of opera singers from Ukraine, Soviet Union and Russian Empire, including ethnic Ukrainians and people of other ethnicities. This list includes those who were born in the Ukraine/Soviet Union/Poland but later emigrated, and those, who were born elsewhere but immigrated to the country and performed there for a long time.

Opera came to the Russian Empire in the 18th century. At first there were mostly Italian-language operas presented by Italian opera troupes. Later some Ukrainian composers serving to the Russian Imperial Court such as Dmitry Bortniansky and Maksym Berezovsky began to write operas in French and Italian. Composers in the 19th century included Semen Hulak-Artemovsky, Mykola Lysenko, and Mykhailo Verbytsky. Their traditions were carried on to the 20th century by Yuliy Meitus, Heorhiy Maiboroda, Stanyslav Lyudkevych and Oleksandr Bilash. The Kyiv Opera Theatre continues to be the main opera and ballet venue of Ukraine.

A number of Ukrainian opera singers rose to fame already in the 19th century, but it was the 20th centuries that saw the appearance of many world-renowned, well-remembered and still popular soloists.

List

A–L

Renata Babak
Lena Belkina
Olga Bezsmertna
Andrei Bondarenko
Andrij Dobriansky
Oksana Dyka
Zoia Gaidai
Borys Hmyria
Dmytro Hnatyuk
Kateryna Kasper
Taras Konoshchenko
Mykola Koval
Andriy Kikot
Alexander Kipnis
Ivan Kozlovsky
Solomiya Krushelnytska
Victoria Loukianetz

M–Z

Yuri Mazurok
Ira Malaniuk
Evgeniya Miroshnichenko
Liudmyla Monastyrska
Olga Mykytenko
Vyacheslav Polozov
Misha Raitzin
Mark Reizen
Lyudmila Shirina
Maria Sokil
Anatoliy Solovianenko
Mariia Stefiuk
Fyodor Stravinsky
Irena Turkevycz-Martynec

External links

 
Opera singers
Ukrainian Singers
Ukrainian
Ukrainian